Hira Solanki is a Member of Legislative assembly from Rajula constituency in Gujarat for its 12th legislative assembly. Solanki belongs to Koli community of Gujarat.

References

Living people
Women in Gujarat politics
Koli people
Gujarat MLAs 2007–2012
Gujarat MLAs 2012–2017
21st-century Indian women politicians
21st-century Indian politicians
Bharatiya Janata Party politicians from Gujarat
Year of birth missing (living people)